Shkulev Media Holding is one of Russia's largest media companies. It has 55 regional branches and representative offices in Russia and Ukraine. The total circulation of publications exceeds 11 million, the total audience is over 16.2 million readers. Hearst Shkulev Media ranks in the Top 10 media companies in Russia by audience. 

The partner and parent company of Hearst Shkulev Media is the Hearst Corporation.

History 
Until 2011, the company was owned by Hachette Filipacchi Médias.

Hearst Shkulev Digital 
The digital media branch of Hearst Shkulev Media consists a network of women's internet portals (Sites Elle.ru, WomansDay.ru, Starhit.ru, MarieClaire.ru, ElleGirl.ru, Parents.ru, Psychologies.ru), project MaximOnline.ru, mobile applications and digital editions.

The regional network of Hearst Shkulev Digital is a network of city portals such as NGS, the city portal of Ekaterinburg E1.RU (www.e1.ru), Nizhny Novgorod NN.RU (www.nn.ru) and NNOV.RU (www.nnov.ru), Samara city's "Samara24" (www.samara24.ru), Perm city portal PRM.RU (www.prm.ru), Sochi's "Sochi Express"(www.sochi-express.ru), Novokuznetsk's Job24 (www.job42.ru).

The total audience of the Hearst Shkulev Digital's projects is more than 11 million visitors per month.

References 

1998 establishments in Russia
Companies based in Moscow
Hearst Communications
Magazine publishing companies
Mass media companies established in 1998
Mass media companies of Russia
Mass media companies of Ukraine
Publishing companies established in 1998
Publishing companies of Russia
Publishing companies of Ukraine
Russian news websites
Ukrainian news websites